Yevhen Omelyanovych Petrushevych (June 3, 1863 in Busk, Kingdom of Galicia and Lodomeria, Kronland of Austro-Hungary – August 29, 1940 in Berlin, Germany) was a Ukrainian lawyer, politician, and president of the Western Ukrainian National Republic formed after the collapse of the Austro-Hungarian Empire in 1918.

Biography

He was born on June 3, 1863, in the town of Busk, of Galicia in the clerical family of a Greek-Catholic priest of noble background.  After graduating from the Lviv Academic Gymnasium he studied law at the Lviv University, where he was one of the leaders of the student movement and headed the Academic Fraternity. After earning a doctorate in law, he started a practice in Sokal. He was regarded with favor by the people because of his professionalism in defending them from the self-will of powers. At the same time he headed the district Prosvita educational society and was an organizer of the cultural and educational life. He became an active member of Ukrainian National Democratic Party formed in 1899.

In 1907, Yevhen Petrushevych was elected to the Imperial Council of Cisleithania (Reichsrat). He became one of the leaders and then a head of Ukrainian Parliament Club. In 1910 he was elected to the Galician Sejm in Lviv from the Stryj district. Being a leading figure of the Ukrainian Sejm Club, he headed the determined fight for a new election law and achieved the increase of the quota of Ukrainian mandates in the Sejm from 12 to 34, and then to 62.

During World War I as head of the Ukrainian Parliament representation he struggled against the plans of Galicia annexation by Poland and was an adherent of the territory autonomy within Austria. Being the head of the Galician delegation in Brest-Litovsk in February 1918, he favoured the introduction of Austria’s liability of granting autonomy to Galicia into the secret appendix of the International conference resolution. Jointly with Czech and Slovakian parliamentarians he worked out a project about the formation of national states united with Austria on the Empires lands and submitted it for the Kaiser's consideration. The manifest of Kaiser Karl on October 18, 1918 proclaimed the right of peoples to self-determination.

On October 19, the representative Ukrainian Constituent in Lviv approved the resolution on formation of the independent Ukrainian State in the western ethnic territory. To implement the resolution they elected the Ukrainian National Rada (Council); Yevhen Petrushevych became its president. Being an adherent of the peaceful power transfer to Ukrainians he carried out negotiations with officials in Vienna. But in connection with the threat on the part of Poles, Lviv delegation of the National Council headed by Kost Levytsky seized power under arms and on November 1 proclaimed the formation of the Western Ukrainian People's Republic (ZUNR). Levytsky's government was formed on November 9 and started the construction of the national state.

After the outbreak of the Polish-Ukrainian War and a defeat at Lviv, the ZUNR government remained in Stanislaviv. Being the president of the National Council, Petrushevych mainly performed representative functions, but owing to his political culture and parliamentary experience he had influence on making the most important decisions in the state. The National Council elaborated a number of necessary laws, which regulated the socio-political and economical life, laid the legal foundation of the state and guarded it from acute social conflicts and destructive manifestations.

On June 9, 1919 by decision of the top state authorities, Petrushevych was granted the title of authorized dictator (in Zalishchyky), which meant that he acted both as a president and a head of the government. When in July 1919 the Galician army retreated over the Zbruch into the Ukrainian People's Republic, the ZUNR government settled in Kamyanets-Podilskyi. The relations between Petrushevych and the chairman of Directory Symon Petlura deteriorated during this period, and Petrushevych was dismissed from the Directory for his opposition to the Ukrainian-Polish alliance. In autumn 1919 Petrushevych left for Vienna, where the exile government continued its diplomatic activity for the restoration of ZUNR independence. The president sent Ukrainian delegations to international talks in Riga and Geneva, sent notes and messages in the address of the League of Nations, got a resolution, which recommended a Council of Ambassadors in Paris to review the Galician problem. With the aim to determine the aspirations of Ukrainians he elaborated a fundamental draft of the Constitution of Ukrainian Galician Republic. In 1922 Petrushevych headed Ukrainian delegation to Geneva where the international conference took place.

But on March 15, 1923, the Council of Ambassadors approved a resolution according to which the West Ukrainian lands were annexed by Poland without reservation.

After the liquidation of the exile government, Petrushevych continued diplomatic and patriotic actions in defense of the oppressed Ukrainian Galician people, spread notes and protests, and continued publishing the ZUNR organ, Ukrainsky prapor (Ukrainian Banner). As a result of his disappointment over the March decision he adopted an openly Sovietophile position. He maintained contacts with the Soviet representatives in Vienna and Berlin, where he had moved in 1923. In 1923 the Politburo of the All-Union Communist Party decided in favour of funding Petrushevych's activities, and two years later the Ukrainian Politburo made a similar decision. Petrushevych continued receiving financial support at least until the end of the 1920s.

In spite of the emigrant's life difficulties, in old age he collaborated with the Ukrainian National Association, maintained relations with Hetman Pavlo Skoropadsky.

Petrushevych died on August 29, 1940 and was buried at Berlin cemetery of St. Hedwig's Cathedral.

On November 1, 2002, the remains of Yevhen Petrushevych were reburied at the Lviv Lychakiv Cemetery on the initiative of Yuri Ferentsevich.

References

External links

 Dictatorship of the Western Province of the Ukrainian National Republic  in the Internet Encyclopedia of Ukraine, vol. 1 (1984)

1863 births
1940 deaths
People from Busk, Ukraine
People from the Kingdom of Galicia and Lodomeria
Ukrainian Austro-Hungarians
Ukrainian nobility
Members of the Ukrainian Greek Catholic Church
Members of the Austrian House of Deputies (1907–1911)
Members of the Austrian House of Deputies (1911–1918)
Members of the Diet of Galicia and Lodomeria
Leaders of Ukraine
Heads of state of Ukraine
West Ukrainian People's Republic people
Ukrainian emigrants to Germany
Ukrainian independence activists
Burials at Lychakiv Cemetery